Felton Perry (born September 11, 1945) is an American actor. He is most notable for his roles as Deputy Obrah Eaker in the 1973 movie Walking Tall, and as Inspector Early Smith in the 1973 movie Magnum Force, the second film in the Dirty Harry series. Felton's other well-known role is in the 1987 science fiction movie RoboCop as Donald Johnson, an executive at the corporation Omni Consumer Products (OCP). He reprised his role as Johnson in the sequels RoboCop 2 (1990) and RoboCop 3 (1993).

Perry is also a playwright known for such plays as Buy the Bi and Bye which in 1976 the Progress Bulletin called an "offbeat and hilarious black satire with a zinging performance by Ron Thompson."

Career
A life member of the Actors Studio, Felton starred on the television show Hooperman as Inspector Clarence McNeil. He has made guest appearances on many TV series, including 227, Adam-12, Ironside, Hill Street Blues, L.A. Law, Cagney and Lacey, What's Happening Now!!, Ironside, Mannix, The Partridge Family, Barnaby Jones, The Fresh Prince of Bel-Air, N.Y.P.D. Blue, Judging Amy, Civil Wars, Murphy Brown, Stingray, Marcus Welby, M.D., Sports Night and The West Wing.

He has also voiced characters in animation including the feature film The Nine Lives of Fritz the Cat and the children's television series A Pup Named Scooby-Doo.

Partial filmography

Medium Cool (1969) – Black Militant
Brute Corps (1971) – Hill
Night Call Nurses (1972) – Jude
Trouble Man (1972) – Bobby Golden
Walking Tall (1973) – Deputy Obrah Eaker
Magnum Force (1973) – Inspector Early Smith
The Nine Lives of Fritz the Cat (1974) – (voice)
The Towering Inferno (1974) – SFFD Firefighter Scott
Sudden Death (1977) – Wyatt Spain
Mean Dog Blues (1978) – Jake Turner
Down and Out in Beverly Hills (1986) – Al
RoboCop (1987) – Donald Johnson
Weeds (1987) – Associate Warden
Checking Out (1989) – Dr. Duffin
RoboCop 2 (1990) – Donald Johnson
Talent for the Game (1991) – Fred
Perfume (1991) – Freddy
Let's Kill All the Lawyers (1992) – Cyrus
RoboCop 3 (1993) – Donald Johnson
Relentless 3 (1993) – Detective Ziskie
Puppet Master 4 (1993) – Dr. Carl Baker
Dumb & Dumber (1994) – Detective Dale
Dark Breed (1996) – Astronaut Bill Powell
Buck and the Magic Bracelet (1999) – Shanka
Hollywood Vampyr (2002) – Professor Chiles 
The Members (2007) – Mjaji 
Robodoc: The Creation of Robocop (Documentary) (TBA) – Himself

Television appearances

Room 222 (1969) – E.M. Farmer
Ironside (1969–1973) – Gilbert Loggins / Roger Stewart / Mustafa / Charlie Tattersall
Dragnet (1970) – Howie Frazer
Julia (1970) – Jerome
Nanny and the Professor (1970) – Fred
O'Hara, US Treasury (1971–1972) – Don Eberly / Billy Trent
Adam-12 (1971–1972) – Floyd Sinclair / Cleotis James
Mannix (1972) – Jesse / Berdue
Medical Center (1974) – Jeff
Police Story (1975) – Clyde Williamson
Barnaby Jones (1978) – Alexander Street
Hill Street Blues (1982–1985) – Bobby Castro / Alonzo / Carter Reese
Cagney & Lacey (1985) – Earl Covay
Hooperman (1987–1989) – Inspector Clarence McNeil
L.A. Law (1986–1990) – Detective Lester Tuttle
Daughter of the Streets (1990) - Captain Towers 
Murphy Brown (1991) – John Lloyd Barrows
The Fresh Prince of Bel-Air (1991–1992) – Lester
Hangin' with Mr. Cooper (1993) – Mr. Foster
NYPD Blue (1994) – Calvin Butler
Living Single (1995) – Bernie
Sports Night (1998) – Man
Judging Amy (2002) – Dr. Connelly

References

External links

1945 births
Living people
Male actors from Chicago
American male film actors
American male voice actors
African-American male actors
African-American dramatists and playwrights
American male television actors
American dramatists and playwrights
21st-century African-American people
20th-century African-American people